Una Assembly constituency may refer to 

 Una, Gujarat Assembly constituency
 Una, Himachal Pradesh Assembly constituency